The 1928 East Tennessee State Teachers football team was an American football team that represented East Tennessee State Teacher's College—now known as East Tennessee State University (ETSU)—as an independent in the 1927 college football season. They were led by fourth-year coach John Robinson. He was referred to affectionately as "Robbie" and was so popular that later the 1929 yearbook was dedicated to him. Robinson was assisted by William "Willie" Flinn Rogers, who taught history and government at the school from 1925 to 1928. For the first time since the program started, the 1928 squad had 28 men come out for football with 10 returning lettermen. As a result, the 1928 team was a success with their first winning record since the 1921 season, which included wins against high school competition. This season also marked the first time the school play  rival Appalacchian State, which was then known as Appalachian Training School of Boone.

Schedule

References

East Tennessee State Teachers
East Tennessee State Buccaneers football seasons
East Tennessee State Teachers football